Robert Garcia (January 9, 1933 – January 25, 2017) was a United States representative who represented New York's 21st district (South Bronx). He was elected to the New York State Assembly in 1965 and the New York State Senate in 1967, and then served in Congress from 1978 to 1990.

Early life
Garcia was born in Bronx, New York, of parents born in Puerto Rico. His father was born in Spain then immigrated to Puerto Rico and had worked in the Central Aguirre sugar mill on the island's south coast; his mother was born and raised in Ponce. They had migrated to New York City from the island in the 1920s; being born on the island, the Jones Act of 1917 had made them U.S. citizens, their ship bypassing Ellis Island and docking directly at Brooklyn.

Education and war service 
He attended the New York City public schools and graduated from Haaren High School in Manhattan in 1950. He served in the United States Army from 1950–53 during the Korean War as a radio operator with the Third Infantry Division. He continued his education from 1953–57 by enrolling in the City College of New York, although he also attended the Community College of New York as well as the RCA Institute.

After graduation, he worked as a computer engineer with IBM Control Data, from 1957–65.

Public service career
Garcia's first experience in politics was circulating nominating petitions for John F. Kennedy's 1960 presidential bid, and he quickly became active in local politics along with Herman Badillo under the tutelage of Felipe Torres. Garcia was elected a Democratic member of the New York State Assembly in 1966 and 1967.

On March 28, 1967, he was elected to the New York State Senate, to fill the vacancy caused by the resignation of Eugene Rodriguez. He retained his seat in the Assembly until the end of the session of 1967. He took his seat in the State Senate at the beginning of the 1968 session and remained in the State Senate until 1978, serving in the 177th, 178th, 179th, 180th, 181st and 182nd New York State Legislature. In the Senate he was Deputy Minority Leader from 1975 to 1978. He was a delegate to the 1976 Democratic National Convention.

He took a keen interest in prison conditions at New York's correctional facilities. As a result, at the outbreak of the Attica Prison riot in early September 1971, he was asked by Republican Governor Nelson Rockefeller to serve on the Mediation Committee sent into the burning prison along with Badillo and others. 39 hostages and inmates were killed, and 89 others were wounded, when state troops stormed the prison.

Congress 
A Democrat, Garcia was first nevertheless elected to Congress (95th United States Congress) from the Bronx on the Republican and Liberal tickets on February 14, 1978, to fill the vacancy caused by the resignation of Herman Badillo; He took his seat on February 21, 1978, as a Democrat, however, after being accepted by the Democratic Caucus in the House. He was re-elected to the 96th, 97th, 98th, 99th, 100th and 101st United States Congresses.

 Garcia was the official representative of the United States Congress to NATO, and was instrumental in developing better relations between Spain and Latin America and both the Carter and Reagan Administrations.
 He was instrumental in the release of DEA Agents being held by Cuba, meeting repeatedly over several days with then-president Fidel Castro.
 Garcia also had a prominent role in designation of the Martin Luther King National Holiday.
 He joined with Republican Congressman Jack Kemp to draft and pass the Kemp-Garcia Enterprise Zone law designed to create jobs in inner-city neighborhoods.
 As a member of the US Delegation celebrating the establishment of diplomatic relations with the People's Republic of China in 1979 he met with Chairman Teng Hsiao-ping and other Chinese leaders.
 Garcia was a pioneer in helping American Hispanics achieve political representation and benefits to which they were entitled due to their growing population. He convinced President Carter to include "Hispanic" as an option for the first time in the history of the US Census Bureau in 1980.
 As the only Representative of Puerto Rican descent with a vote on the floor of Congress (Puerto Rico's Resident Commissioner could then vote in Committee, but not on the Floor), Garcia was the de facto Congressman representing 3.6 million US citizens on the Island-Territory, and was often called upon to represent their interests in legislation before the House.

Legal investigation and resignation 
Garcia remained in Congress until January 7, 1990, when he decided to resign following his trial on charges by US Attorney Rudy Giuliani that he was linked to the Wedtech scandal.

Wedtech conviction and exoneration
The overarching case that came to be known as the Wedtech Scandal stemmed from Bronx defense contractor Wedtech Corporation loans obtained from the Small Business Administration (SBA), a Federal agency which was giving loans to minority-owned businesses in the 1980s. Wedtech had been founded by a Bronx native of Puerto Rican descent, John Mariotta, but one of his partners, Fred Neuberger, quietly acquired more than 50% ownership, which suddenly made the company ineligible for special SBA treatment and millions of dollars in government contracts. Wedtech continued to claim it was minority-owned anyway.

Federal investigations mushroomed into something much larger that would end up implicating more than twenty people, both in government and in business. Garcia was convicted of extortion, but his conviction was reversed by the Appellate Court.

Later life and death
Following the reversal of his conviction, Garcia joined Charles Colson's "Prison Fellowship" program, which he developed to minister to those in prison. Both Garcia's father and sister, Aimee, had become pastors in the Pentecostal Church, and Garcia worked with Colson for a time. He continued to consult for public and private-sector clients in the mainland U.S. and Puerto Rico and continued to do so with Garcia Associates.

Garcia died from an infection due to his emphysema on January 25, 2017, in San Juan, Puerto Rico, sixteen days after his 84th birthday.

Honors and recognitions
In addition to the many awards bestowed on him while in elected public service, former Congressman Garcia is increasingly being recognized for his pioneering role in Black and Hispanic politics, with organizations such as the Congressional Hispanic Caucus Institute, the New York State Assembly and Senate and the National Association of Latino Elected Officials (NALEO) honoring him at gala events in 2015 and 2016.

See also
 List of American federal politicians convicted of crimes
 List of federal political scandals in the United States
 List of Hispanic and Latino Americans in the United States Congress
 Nuyorican
 Puerto Ricans in New York City

References

External links

 

|-

|-

|-

|-

|-

|-

1933 births
2017 deaths
American politicians of Puerto Rican descent
Burials at Arlington National Cemetery
Democratic Party members of the United States House of Representatives from New York (state)
Haaren High School alumni
Hispanic and Latino American members of the United States Congress
Hispanic and Latino American state legislators in New York (state)
IBM employees
Democratic Party members of the New York State Assembly
Military personnel from New York City
New York (state) politicians convicted of crimes
Democratic Party New York (state) state senators
Politicians from the Bronx
Puerto Rican people in New York (state) politics
United States Army personnel of the Korean War
Members of Congress who became lobbyists